Balikpapan Bay (Indonesian: Teluk Balikpapan), is a bay in Indonesia, near Borneo island close to the city of Balikpapan, East Kalimantan, Indonesia. The Indonesian company Pertamina has its largest oil refinery on the eastern side of the bay.

Location
Balikpapan Bay is located on the western side of Makassar Strait, in the south-west of the Pacific Ocean.
The bay borders several areas.
 North: Penajam Paser Utara Regency
 East: Balikpapan city
 South: Makassar Strait
 West: Penajam city and Penajam Paser Utara Regency.

Balikpapan bay is the mouth of several rivers such as Wain River before merging into Makassar strait.

Ports and harbors
Several public ports were located in Balikpapan Bay, such as:
 Semayang Harbor, the largest passenger and cargo for Balikpapan city.
 Kampung Baru Harbor, a harbour serving ferry boat passenger to Sulawesi
 Kariangau Harbor, a ferry harbor to Balikpapan city.
 Penajam Harbor, a ferry harbor to Penajam city.

Private ports were also located in this area, such as:

 Pertamina, on the eastern part.
 Chevron, on the western part.
 Several coal mining company has its own private port on western and northern part.

External links

Gulfs of the Pacific Ocean
Bays of Indonesia
Landforms of East Kalimantan
Landforms of Kalimantan